All India Defence Employees Federation is a trade union in India that organizes civilian workers in factories and other establishments under the Ministry of Defence. AIDEF is supported jointly by the All India Trade Union Congress and the Centre of Indian Trade Unions. AIDEF was founded in 1953.

S.N. Pathak is the president  C. Srikumar are General Secretary's of AIDEF.(From June'2013 to June 2016)

AIDEF opposes privatization of Defence units and ordnance factories.

Trade unions in India
Trade unions established in 1953
Trade unions in Indian Defence
Defence and munitions trade unions
1953 establishments in India